American singer and songwriter Jazmine Sullivan has released four studio albums and 15 singles. Sullivan signed a record deal with J Records in 2008, and released her debut album Fearless in 2008. The album was immediately certified gold by the Recording Industry Association of America while debuting at number one. Fearless has spent 12 weeks atop the Billboard Top R&B/Hip-Hop Albums since its US release. The album's first single, "Need U Bad", also reached number thirty-seven on the Billboard Hot 100 and became her first number one on the Hot R&B/Hip-Hop Songs. The second single, "Bust Your Windows", was released in September 2008 and reached the charts in the US and the UK. It also became her second top forty in the US. "Lions, Tigers & Bears" was released as the third single off the album in late 2008 and became her third top ten in the Hot R&B/Hip-Hop Songs chart in the US. In 2009, it was confirmed Jazmine would open for American singer Ne-Yo's tour. In February that same year, she released the fourth and final single, "Dream Big".

Love Me Back, Sullivan's second studio album, was released on November 29, 2010. The album reached number five on the Top R&B/Hip-Hop Albums, and her single, "Holding You Down (Goin' in Circles)", reached number sixty on the Billboard Hot 100 and was nominated for Best Female R&B Vocal Performance at the 2011 Grammy Awards Another single, "10 Seconds", reached the top twenty on the Hot R&B/Hip-Hop Songs. 

Reality Show, Sullivan's third studio album, was released on January 13, 2015. "Dumb" was released as the lead single from the album on May 13, 2014, and debuted at number 45 on the R&B/Hip-Hop Airplay. The second single, "Forever Don't Last" was released on September 16, 2014, and peaked at number 10 on Adult R&B Songs, where it became her second top ten single on that chart.

Albums

Studio albums

Reissue albums

Extended plays

Singles

As lead artist

Promotional singles

As featured artist

Other charted songs

Notes

Guest appearances

Songwriting credits

References

Discography
Discographies of American artists
Rhythm and blues discographies
Soul music discographies